Sar Tang-e Tut-e Nadeh (also Romanized as Sar Tang-e Tūt-e Nadeh; also known as Sar Tang, Sartang-e Pā’īn, and Sartang-e Soflá) is a village in Tut-e Nadeh Rural District, in the Central District of Dana County, Kohgiluyeh and Boyer-Ahmad Province, Iran. At the 2006 census, its population was 277, in 55 families.

References 

Populated places in Dana County